Akhateli, is a village in Telavi district of Georgia. The village is located on the river Turdo.

See also
 Telavi Municipality

References 

Populated places in Telavi Municipality